Melaleuca ryeae is a plant in the myrtle family, Myrtaceae and is endemic to the south west of Western Australia. It is a small shrub, closely resembling Melaleuca amydra with its small leaves and profuse heads of pink to purple flowers but M.amydra has narrower leaves and does not have spherical clusters of fruits.

Description

The flowers are a shade of pink, arranged in heads on the ends of most of the branches which continue to grow after flowering and sometimes also in the upper leaf axils. There are five bundles of stamens around the flower, each with 5 to 9 stamens.

Taxonomy and naming
The specific epithet (ryeae) honours Barbara Rye, a botanist and student of the family Myrtaceae.

Distribution and habitat
This melaleuca occurs in and between the Arrino, Eneabba and Bullsbrook districts in the Avon Wheatbelt, Geraldton Sandplains and Swan Coastal Plain biogeographic regions. It grows in swamps, in seasonally wet areas and on sandplains.

Conservation
Melaleuca ryeae is listed as "not threatened" by the Government of Western Australia Department of Parks and Wildlife.

Use in horticulture
This species of melaleuca has been cultivated in temperate areas with winter rainfall, forming compact shrubs which are especially attractive in flower.

References

ryeae
Myrtales of Australia
Plants described in 1999
Rosids of Western Australia
Endemic flora of Western Australia
Taxa named by Lyndley Craven